Cavin Soh (born 17 November 1970)  (苏智诚/苏志诚 Su Zhi Cheng previous name) is a Singaporean actor, host, watch dealer and singer.

Career
Soh used to be a lead singer in the band Dreamz FM (梦飞船) and a radio deejay on MediaCorp's Chinese language station Y.E.S. 93.3FM before switching to television and acting. In 2005, he won the Best Supporting Actor award for his portrayal of Zhou Daqiu, the antagonist, in Portrait of Home. The character was also voted the Top 10 Most Memorable Villains at the Star Awards 2007 anniversary special.

Besides acting in dramas, Soh still juggles his musical interests with television commitments. He has written and performed the theme songs of a number of drama series and was a judge on SuperBand and Campus SuperStar.

Personal life
Soh was schooled at Maris Stella High School (Primary and Secondary). Afterwards, he graduated with a Diploma in Mechanical Engineering at Ngee Ann Polytechnic. Thereafter, he was conferred with an honours degree from the University of Glasgow, Scotland. 

Soh married Serena Yeo in December 2009, and they have a son and a daughter.

Filmography

Television

Variety Shows

Discography

Drama Theme Songs

Dreamz FM
Singles

| 2022|| When Duty Calls 2 (卫国先锋2) || Theme song of ' 'Nu Fang (怒放)''

Accolades

References

External links
Profile on xinmsn

1970 births
Singaporean male television actors
Singaporean singer-songwriters
Singaporean people of Hakka descent
Living people
21st-century Singaporean male actors
Hakka musicians
21st-century Singaporean male singers
Singaporean Mandopop singers
|}